The 2000 West Oxfordshire District Council election took place on 4 May 2000 to elect members of West Oxfordshire District Council in Oxfordshire, England. One third of the council was up for election and the Conservative Party gained overall control of the council from no overall control.

After the election, the composition of the council was:
Conservative 26
Liberal Democrats 13
Independent 8
Labour 2

Election result
The Conservatives gained a majority on the council for the first time in 11 years with 26 councillors, after taking 47% of the vote and 11 of the 17 seats contested.
 The Conservative gains included taking seats from Labour in Chipping Norton and Witney West, as well as Minster Lovell from an independent, while the Conservative group leader Barry Norton was easily re-elected in North Leigh.

The Conservative gains came mostly at the expense of the Labour party, who with 20% of the vote lost five seats to be left with only two councillors. Meanwhile, the Liberal Democrats remained with 13 councillors after taking 21% of the vote.

Ward results

References

2000 English local elections
2000
2000s in Oxfordshire